General elections were held in Azad Kashmir on 21 July 2016 to elect 41 members of the Azad Kashmir Legislative Assembly. Polling started at 8:00am and continued till 5:00pm without any break.

Members

References 

2016 in Pakistan
2016 in Pakistani politics
2016
8th Legislative Assembly of Azad Kashmir